Miss Ironside's School (also called Miss Ironside's Day School and Miss Ironside's School For Girls) was a school at 2 Elvaston Place, in Kensington. The journalist John Walsh, writing in The Daily Telegraph, called it "legendary".

Notable alumnae included:

 Salimah Aga Khan (née Sarah Frances Croker Poole)), former fashion model and an ex-wife of the IV Aga Khan Prince Karim Aga Khan
 Jane Birkin, singer and actor
 Sheila and Ellen-Craig Crosland, daughters of Susan Crosland, journalist, and step-daughters of Tony Crosland, Labour Education Minister who started the comprehensive school movement in the UK
 Rose Dugdale, a militant in the Irish republican organisation and the Provisional Irish Republican Army (IRA)
 Jane Fawcett, a World War II codebreaker, singer, and heritage preservationist
 Teresa Hayter, writer and activist
 Sarah Hogg, Viscountess Hailsham (née Boyd-Carpenter), economist, journalist, and politician
 Virginia Ironside, journalist, agony aunt and writer, whose great-aunt was headmistress
 Tracy Reed, actor
 Jan Struther, writer

References 

Girls' schools in London
Defunct schools in the Royal Borough of Kensington and Chelsea